John Misto (born 13 October 1952) is an Australian playwright and screenwriter. He graduated with an Arts/Law degree from the University of New South Wales, and then practised as a lawyer before changing his career to concentrate on working as a recognized theatre and television writer.

Select credits
A Country Practice (1981)
Waterloo Station (1983)
The Young Doctors (1983)
Starting Out (1983)
Palace of Dreams (1985) -2 episodes
Natural Causes (1985) 
Dancing Daze (1986)
The Last Frontier (1986)
Dusty (1988) (TV series)
Touch the Sun: Peter and Pompey (1988) (TV movie)
The Dirtwater Dynasty (1988)
The Fremantle Conspiracy (1988)
G.P. (1989–91) – 3 episodes
Butterfly Island (1993) (TV movie)
The Damnation of Harvey McHugh (1994) – creator, 13 episodes
The Day of the Roses (1998)
Finding Hope (2001) (TV movie)
Heroes' Mountain (2002) (TV movie)
MDA (2002) – 1 episode
White Collar Blue (2003) – 3 episodes
Second Chance (2005) (TV movie)
The Cut (2009) – 6 episodes
Sisters of War (2010) (TV movie)
Tricky Business (2012) – 1 episode

Theatre Credits
The Last Time I Saw Paris (1980)
Room for Dreamers (1980)
The Dying of Angel Dunleavy (1980)
Sky (1992)
The Shoe-Horn Sonata (1995)
Gossamer (1997)
Harp on the Willow (2007)
Dark Voyager (2014)
Madame Rubinstein (2017) [produced in Sydney as Lip Service]

References

External links

John Misto, Lateral Learning Speakers' Agency.

1952 births
Living people
Australian television writers
Australian dramatists and playwrights
University of New South Wales alumni
Australian male television writers